Mumbai Railway Vikas Corporation (MRVC) is an Indian public sector undertaking responsible to execute railway projects under Mumbai Urban Transport Project (MUTP) as sanctioned by Ministry of Railways for enhancing suburban rail transportation. It was incorporated under Companies Act, 1956 on 12 July 1999 with an equity capital of Rs. 25 crore shared in the ratio of 51:49 between Ministry of Railways and Government of Maharashtra. MRVC is also involved in the planning and development of Mumbai Suburban Rail system.

The main objectives of MUTP are:
 Bringing down the passengers per 9 coach to 3000 as against existing 5000. 
 Segregate the suburban train operation from the main line passenger and freight services

Objectives
Integrate suburban rail capacity enhancement plans with urban development plan for Mumbai and propose investments.
Implement the rail infrastructure projects in Mumbai suburban sections.
Commercially develop Railway land and airspace in Mumbai area to raise funds for suburban railway development.
Resettlement & Rehabilitation of Project Affected Households.

Overview
The Suburban Railway System in Mumbai is the most complex, densely loaded and intensively used system in the world. It also known as Mumbai Local. It has the highest passenger density in the world – 7.2 million commuters travel every day. Two zonal Railways, Western Railway (WR) and Central Railway (CR), operate the Mumbai Suburban Railway System. It is spread over an expanse of 319 route km. The suburban services are run by Electric Multiple Units (EMUs). 196 rakes (train sets) of 9-car, 12-car & 15-car composition are used to run more than 2600 train services. It was operated on 1500 volt DC power supply from overhead catenary (until April 2016 when the whole network was converted into 25 kV, 50 Hz AC).

References

External links
 

Companies based in Mumbai
Railway companies of India
Railway companies established in 1999
1999 establishments in Maharashtra
Rail transport in Mumbai
Government-owned companies of India